Dialogues of the Gods are 25 miniature dialogues mocking the Homeric conception of the Greek gods written in the Attic Greek dialect by the Syrian author Lucian of Samosata. There are 25 dialogues in total. The work was translated into Latin c. 1518 by Livio Guidolotto (also called Guidalotto or Guidalotti), the apostolic assistant of Pope Leo X.

The Dialogues

Dialogue I: Prometheus and Zeus 
Prometheus asks Zeus to be released from Caucasus, where he's been chained ever since he stole fire from the gods. Zeus, still angry at him, refuses, reminding Prometheus of his crimes, and argues that his punishment is in fact too light. Prometheus pleads again with him, and promises he'll give Zeus vital information. Zeus is reluctant, but agrees, and Prometheus warns him not to woo Thetis, for she is destined to give birth to a son mightier than his father, who could potentially overthrow Zeus. Disappointed, Zeus says that Thetis will never be his, and tells Prometheus that he'll have Hephaestus release him.

Dialogue II: Eros and Zeus 
Zeus is angry at Eros, who asks Zeus to forgive him, seeing how he's just a small child. Zeus is not buying it, given Eros' ancient age. He demands to know why Eros keeps playing with him, compelling Zeus to transform into a satyr, then a bull, then gold, then a swan, then an eagle, since Eros never makes women reciprocate Zeus' love, forcing Zeus to deceive them. Eros simply says it's because they're mortal, and cannot withstand his true form, but Zeus says that Hyacinthus and Branchus both loved Apollo. Eros points out that Daphne, however, did not love him; he suggests that in order to be more desirable, Zeus should grow long locks, wear fashionable clothes, and take part in dances. Zeus declines, and tells Eros to stop with his tricks.

Dialogue III: Zeus and Hermes 
Zeus asks Hermes if he's heard of the Argive princess Io, to which Hermes responds positively. Zeus informs him that because of Hera's jealousy, the girl's been turned into a cow, then placed her under the strict guardship of Argus. Zeus orders Hermes to scoop down in Nemea, kill Argus and lead Io to Egypt, where she'll be worshiped as the goddess Isis.

Dialogue IV: Ganymede and Zeus 

Zeus has just snatched Ganymede from earth, who asks to be returned back, and is distressed by the reveal that the eagle who grabbed him had turned into a man. Zeus explains that he's neither an eagle nor a man, but the king of gods. Ganymede wonders whether he's Pan, who is greatly honoured by his family, whereas he thinks Zeus is just a kidnapper. Zeus says he's the god of thunder, which at first confuses Ganymede. Ganymede notes that if he is not returned wolves will eat the sheep he's supposed to guard. Zeus tries his best to explain to Ganymede that he is a god now who has no need of sheep, while Ganymede laments his fate and all the things he'll miss from his life as a mortal.  Zeus tells him that his new job will be to serve nectar to the gods, and sleep with him at night. Ganymede appears to be oblivious to what sleeping with Zeus means, saying that when he was a child he would sleep with his father, who would always complain about Ganymede kicking him in his sleep, and send him to his mother's bed. Zeus has no problem with that, saying he'll be kissing him anyway, and orders Hermes to offer some ambrosia to Ganymede, to make him immortal, as well as explain how to serve ambrosia correctly.

Dialogue V: Hera and Zeus (I) 
Hera complains to Zeus that ever since he kidnapped the boy from Ida, he's been paying no attention whatsoever to her. Zeus is surprised by that, and Hera tells him that it's inappropriate for the king of gods to abandon his wife like that to find the company of mortal women. She's even more offended by Ganymede, whom Zeus has brought to Olympus (as compared to the mortal women he eventually abandons) and made his cup-bearer, as if Hebe and Hephaestus are not already enough. Moreover, she complains about how Zeus can't keep his hands off the boy and kisses him at every opportunity. Zeus says that if he allowed her to kiss Ganymede too, she'd understand why he prefers his kisses over even nectar. Their banter continues, with Hera arguing that Zeus is dishonouring her with his actions, and Zeus defending his choice to keep Ganymede on Olympus. He tells her that her jealousy is only inflaming his love, and orders Ganymede to give him two kisses, instead of just one, when he serves him.

Dialogue VI: Hera and Zeus (II) 
Hera asks Zeus what his opinion of their guest, Ixion, is, and Zeus replies that he is worthy of the company of the gods. Hera, on the other hand, claims he's unworthy. Zeus asks why she thinks so, and though she's reluctant to say, pressed by him, she confesses that Ixion has been making inappropriate advances toward her, which she has tried her best to ignore. Zeus is angered by the mortal's hubris, and blames it on love, which displeases Hera for it reminds her that Zeus slept once with Ixion's wife, fathering Pirithous. Zeus says that it would be improper to kick Ixion out, so instead he suggests they send him a cloud with Hera's likeness. Hera protests, saying that should they do that Ixion will brag to have slept with the queen of gods herself, but Zeus tells her that should he do that, they'll throw him into Tartarus.

Dialogue VII: Hephaestus and Apollo 
Hephaestus asks Apollo if he's seen how beautiful and charming Maia's baby is. Apollo is not amused, saying that the baby has already stolen Poseidon's trident, Ares' sword and his own bow and arrows. Hephaestus hardly seems to believe that, but Apollo tells him to check if he's missing anything, and Hephaestus discovers his pincers are missing. Apollo tells him to search in the baby's cradle to find his pincers; the baby is well revised in the art of stealing, having also stolen Aphrodite's girdle and Zeus' sceptre. He even scoops down in the Undeworld to steal stuff from there, as he leads the souls with the help of a staff, which Hephaestus admits to having given him.

Dialogue VIII: Hephaestus and Zeus 

Zeus orders a perplexed Hephaestus to hit him in the head with his hammer; he tells him to hit with as much might as he can, or he will get angry at him, and not for the first time. Hephaestus agrees to it, but warns him that this won't be Eileithyia's clean, bloodless work; Zeus says he doesn't care, and Hephaestus does as told. Zeus' skull cracks, and a goddess emerges from his open head. Hephaestus, smitten by her beauty, asks for her hand, but Zeus declines, saying she will remain a virgin for all time.

Dialogue IX: Poseidon and Hermes 
Poseidon asks where he can find Zeus, but Hermes, embarrassed, tells him this isn't the right time. Poseidon takes that to mean that Zeus is in the company of either Hera or Ganymede, but Hermes says no to both. After some pressure from Poseidon, Hermes admits Zeus has just given birth, which surprises Poseidon, who had no idea that Zeus was pregnant. Hermes informs him that the fetus wasn't in his belly, but rather his calf. He explains how Zeus got Semele pregnant, but Hera convinced Semele to ask Zeus to appear to her with all his lightnings and thunderbolts. As a result, Semele burned to death, but Zeus managed to save the baby by shoving it to his calf to continue growth. He further claims that he has given the baby to some nymphs to raise, and he's now off to offer Zeus the proper post-childbirth care.

Dialogue X: Hermes and the Sun 
Hermes goes to find the Sun, to announce to him Zeus' order not to rise for three days. The Sun is worried that he has done something wrong and this is his punishment, but Hermes reassures him that it's nothing of that kind; Zeus is in love with the wife of Amphitryon and wants to be with her. He means to sire a great hero, mightier than any other, with her, and needs time for that. The Sun agrees, but complains about Zeus' actions' consequences to the world, and unfavourably compares him to Cronus, who never abandoned Rhea for the sake of some mortal woman.{{refn|group=note|name=tenth|Helios (and Lucian) is wrong here; Cronus had Chiron by Philyra.<ref>Pseudo-Apollodorus, Bibliotheca 1.2.4</ref>}} Hermes tells him to hush, for he will get into trouble should anyone hear him, and goes off to give the same message to the Moon and Sleep.

 Dialogue XI: Aphrodite and the Moon 

Aphrodite asks the Moon if the rumours are true that she often abandons the sky to meet with her mortal lover Endymion. The Moon answers that she’s not to be blamed for that, but rather Aphrodite’s son Eros. Aphrodite agrees with her, and notes how Eros torments everyone, like Rhea whom he’s made fall in love with Attis, or herself his own mother, when he made Persephone fall for Aphrodite’s lover Adonis as well, so they both have to share him. The Moon says she has a comfort in her passion, as Endymion is a very handsome man. She says that she visits him every night where he sleeps in a cave tiptoeing, trying not to make a noise so he won’t wake up from his sleep.

 Dialogue XII: Aphrodite and Eros (I) 
Aphrodite chides her son for all the trouble he causes; he makes Zeus take a million forms, the Moon to leave the sky, and the Sun to stay in bed with Clymene longer, forgetting to rise. He has even Rhea under his thumb, the mother of gods, making her afraid of what would happen to him should Rhea, fed up with Eros, order the Corybantes or her lions to attack him. Eros tells her not to fear, for he can handle Rhea. He says he should not be blamed for any of this; and after all, would Aphrodite rather not be in love with Ares? Aphrodite warns him to remember what she said.

 Dialogue XIII: Zeus, Asclepius and Heracles 
Asclepius and Heracles are having a row over which should have the higher position on the table; each argues that they are more worthy than the other. Heracles claims that he has accomplished so many goals, and defeated so many foes, he deserves the better place, while Asclepius points out that he himself healed Heracles' burn wounds, and besides, he never killed his family or was a slave to Queen Omphale. Heracles threatens him with violence, but Zeus intervenes and tells Heracles to let Asclepius have the better seat, given how Asclepius died first.

 Dialogue XIV: Hermes and Apollo (I) 

Hermes asks Apollo why he's so blue; Apollo replies it's because he's so unlucky in love. He's now mourning over his lover, the son of Oebalus. Hermes asks if that means he's dead, which Apollo confirms. Hermes asks how did that happen, and Apollo takes full responsibility, prompting Hermes to think Apollo's gone mad; but Apollo explains that the two were playing a discus game, only for Zephyrus, the west wind god who was in love with Hyacinthus as well, to redirect the discus into hitting Hyacinthus in the head, killing him; and that's why Apollo's so sad. Hermes tells him he's being irrational; Apollo was aware that Hyacinthus was mortal, and should have expected his eventual death.

 Dialogue XV: Hermes and Apollo (II) 
Hermes seems unable to believe that lame Hephaestus has managed to marry the most beautiful of the goddesses, meaning Aphrodite and Grace. Apollo thinks it's due to luck; yet he wonders how they're not disgusted to kiss him, as he's dirty and sweaty all the time. Hermes agrees, not fathoming how they themselves, who are so handsome, are alone. Apollo says that in general, he himself is unlucky in love; he loved Daphne and Hyacinthus best of all, but lost both of them. Apollo wonders how Aphrodite and Grace don't seem to be envious of each other; to that, Hermes replies it's because Aphrodite is on Olympus, and Grace in Lemnos. Besides, Aphrodite is actually in love with Ares, and not Hephaestus, unbeknownst to him.

 Dialogue XVI: Hera and Leto 
Hera sarcastically congratulates Leto for the two children she has born Zeus. Leto rebuffs by saying that not everyone can be lucky to have Hephaestus. Hera defends Hephaestus on account for his works, but insults Artemis and Apollo, calling her a cannibal, and belittling his domains. She further claims that her children aren't truly better than Niobe's. Leto replies that Hera is probably jealous to see her [Leto's] children receive so much attention and praise from everyone. Hera mocks this claim, bringing up how Apollo skinned Marsyas alive for challenging him in a music contest and Artemis killed Actaeon for seeing her naked. Leto tells her that Hera feels free to insult everyone due to her status as Zeus' wife, but she'll be miserable once more once he deserts her again in favour of some mortal woman.

 Dialogue XVII: Apollo and Hermes (I) 

Apollo sees Hermes laughing, and asks him what's the matter. Hermes responds that he's witnessed the most ridiculous sight; Hephaestus has trapped Aphrodite and Ares naked in bed. Apollo asks how this came to be, and Hermes tells him that Hephaestus had long been trying to catch them, so he put a thin net on the bed. Ares and Aphrodite laid there, unaware, as the Sun informed Hephaestus, who then called in the other gods to watch the humiliating sight. Apollo wonders how come Hephaestus isn't embarrassed to flaunt his failed marriage like that, but Hermes says he'd gladly be tied himself in bed with Aphrodite, and invites Apollo to come and see for himself.

 Dialogue XVIII: Hera and Zeus (III) 
Hera tells Zeus that she'd be embarrassed if she had a god as feminine and prone to drunkenness as Dionysus, who spends his entire time in the company of the Maenads, partying and drinking wine. Zeus defends his son, bringing up his many accomplishments; how he led a war campaign in India, how he's got the whole of Lydia under his thumb, how he commands the Thracians and the people of Tmolus, all that while wearing ivy, holding his thyrsus and dancing frantic dances. He wonders what he could do sober, if he does all that while drunk. Hera is annoyed to see Zeus praise Dionysus for discovering wine, given what happened to Icarius, who was killed by his drinking companions. Zeus says that this isn't Dionysus' fault, but rather people's inability to do anything in moderation. He also says that Hera's rude words for Dionysus stem from her jealousy over Semele.

 Dialogue XIX: Aphrodite and Eros (II) 
Aphrodite asks Eros how come, after all the victories he has had over gods such as Zeus, Apollo, Poseidon and herself, he never tries his tricks with Athena. Eros says it's because Athena scares him, making Aphrodite wonder why Ares doesn't scare him; Eros replies that's because Ares is welcoming to him, while Athena is ever uninviting.  Furthermore, he doesn't approach the Muses either, out of respect. As for Artemis, he cannot catch up to her, as she runs through the mountains. Besides, she's already in love with another; hunting. Aphrodite notes that Artemis' brother Apollo, on the other hand, Eros has wounded many a time.

 Dialogue XX: Ares and Hermes 
Ares asks Hermes whether he's heard of what Zeus has just claimed, that he is mightier than all other gods combined. Ares admits that Zeus is stronger than all of them separately, but even he could not take them down all at once. Hermes tells Ares to hush in case this gets him into trouble, but Ares, trusting Hermes to be discreet, goes on, and mocks Zeus' claim on the basis of how helpless he was when Hera, Poseidon and Athena rose in rebellion against him and tied him up until Thetis got Briareos to release him. Hermes once again advices him to hush, or they'll both get into trouble.

 Dialogue XXI: Pan and Hermes 
Pan greets Hermes, calling him his father. Hermes asks how come he’s father to goat-legged god like Pan. Pan tells Hermes to remember whether he’s ever raped a maiden from Arcadia; he explains that his mother is Penelope of Sparta, the daughter of Icarius, whom he approached in the form of a goat, so Pan was born with a goat’s lower half. Hermes confirms Pan’s story, but is ashamed to be father to Pan. He asks Pan not to address him as his father in the presence of the other gods, lest they make fun of him.

 Dialogue XXII: Apollo and Dionysus  
Apollo marvels how different the three sons of Aphrodite are; Eros is a most beautiful bowman, Hermaphroditus is half man half woman, and Priapus is unbecomingly manly. Dionysus blames it not on Aphrodite, but rather the different gods who sired those sons on her; he further claims that even children born to the same parents are often so unlike each other, prime example Apollo himself and his sister. Apollo however says that both he and her are archers, and Dionysus counters saying that he is a healer, while she shoots those who offend her. Dionysus says an anecdote about Priapus; the other day he was welcomed by him in his house, but when Dionysus fell asleep, Priapus made (failed) advances toward him. Apollo is amused by that, blaming Dionysus' good looks. Dionysus points out that Apollo is very good-looking as well, and might attract Priapus as well; and Apollo says that in that case, other than hair, he has a bow as well.

 Dialogue XXIII: Hermes and Maia 
Hermes complains to his mother Maia, saying he's the most miserable of the gods. While the rest get to party and drink freely all day long on Olympus, he has so many duties he has no free time left for himself. He is bitter that mere mortal women Alcmene and Semele's sons get to enjoy the best of immortal life, while he, the son of a goddess, has to act like a servant every time Zeus has a job for him. Maia tells him that that's enough, and he should obey his father with no complaint.

 Dialogue XXIV: Zeus and the Sun 

Zeus angrily chides the Sun for trusting the reins of his horse to some youth, which, due to the boy's incompetence, led to the earth being scorched and then frozen; the world would have certainly been destroyed if Zeus hadn't struck him with a lightning bolt. The Sun admits all that, but uses his son's constant begging as an excuse, and says he hadn't foreseen all that destruction. Zeus isn't convinced, saying that it's highly unlikely that the Sun didn't know that the horses could only be controlled with a strong and firm grip, and would run wild with an inexperience driver. The Sun says he knew all that, but he gave in at his son and his wife's pleads. He theorizes that his son was scared when he drove too high, and thus dropped the reins, causing the chaos it did. He asks Zeus not to be too harsh, for his son has already been punished, and he himself is in great mourning. Zeus disagrees that either is enough punishment given the level of catastrophe, and warns the Sun to never send another charioteer in his place again, or he will strike him with his thunderbolts.

 Dialogue XXV: Apollo and Hermes (II) 
Apollo and Hermes discuss Castor and Polydeuces. Apollo can't tell the twins apart, while Hermes can. Hermes informs Apollo that they alternate between Olympus and the Underworld, wishing to stay together forever, which Apollo deems unfair, since he thinks that those two don't offer much, compared to how he gives prophecies and Artemis acts as a midwife. Hermes tells him that their job is to assist Poseidon as protectors of sailors, which doesn't impress Apollo.

 Judgement of Paris 

Another work of Lucian, The Judgement of Paris, deals with Paris having to choose the most beautiful goddess between Hera, Athena and Aphrodite. The three goddesses asked Zeus to be the judge at first.

Zeus, claiming that he loves all three goddesses the same and cannot choose between them, wanting all three to win, says that Paris is a much better fit to be the judge and award the winner with the golden apple, and tasks Hermes to lead the three to Phrygia where they'll find Paris. Aphrodite says they should make Momus the judge, feeling there's no flaw he could find in her, but Hera prefers Zeus' option. The goddesses then argue on Paris being married and whether that is of any importance; but soon the three goddesses and Hermes arrive in Phrygia. They cannot find Paris at first, and when they do, they cannot agree on whom should approach him, until Hermes decides to take the lead and introduce themselves to Paris. Hermes gives the apple to Paris, and Paris reads out loud the inscription ("for the fairest"). He then protests that he, as a mortal, cannot judge the goddesses' beauty, and besides he cannot make up his own mind either. Hermes reminds him this is the order of Zeus. Paris then begins to inspect the three; Athena demands that Aphrodite takes off the charm-enhancing girdle of hers. Aphrodite then counters that Athena should take off her intimidating helmet, and both goddesses abide at the same time, leaving Paris enthralled by their beauty. He says however that he wishes to inspect them in more detail, and Athena and Aphrodite withdraw, leaving Hera alone with Paris, who then offers him to make him the king of Asia, should he give her the apple, but Paris is not interested, and tells her to step aside so he can marvel at Athena. Athena then offers to make him the greatest warrior and conqueror, winner of every battle. Paris says he is not that keen on warring, and tells her to put on her robe and helmet again. Then comes Aphrodite, who lets him take his time and examine her in detail, and promises to him the hand of Helen of Sparta, the daughter of Zeus and Leda, in marriage. Paris, although he has never heard of Helen before and is wary to hear that she is already married to Menelaus, chooses her gift and gives the apple to Aphrodite.

 Gods appearing 
{{columns-list|colwidth=35em|
 Aphrodite
 Apollo
 Ares
 Asclepius
 Dionysus
 Eros
 Ganymede
 Helios
 Hephaestus
 Hera
 Heracles
 Hermes Leto
 Maia
 Pan
 Poseidon Prometheus
 Selene
 Zeus'''
}}

 Notes 

 References 

 External links 

 Lucian D. of the Gods, Translated by Fowler, H W and F G. Oxford: The Clarendon Press. 1905. 
 The Works of Lucian of Samosata at sacred-texts.com Loeb Classical Library, vol. 3/8 of Lucian's works , with facing Greek text, at ancientlibrary.com 
 A.M. Harmon: Introduction to Lucian of Samosata at tertullian.org''
 Lucian of Samosata Project - Articles, Timeline, Maps, Library/Texts, and Themes
 Dialogues of the Gods: Text with running vocabulary and commentary for intermediate readers of Greek, ed. Evan Hayes and Stephen Nimis.  2015
 

2nd-century novels
Ancient Greek novels
Works by Lucian
Satirical works